EQ Virginis is a single variable star in the equatorial constellation of Virgo. It has a baseline visual apparent magnitude of 9.36, but is a flare star that undergoes sporadic bursts of brightening. The star is located at a distance of 67 light-years from the Sun based on parallax measurements, but is drifting closer with a radial velocity of −23 km/s. It is a member of the IC 2391 moving group of stars, which is between 30 and 50 million years old.

This is an orange-hued K-type main-sequence star with a stellar classification of K5Ve, where the 'e' suffix indicates emission lines in the spectrum. The star is classified as an eruptive variable of the UV Ceti type and a BY Draconis variable. It shows strong chromospheric activity with extensive star spots that, on average, cover ~24% of the surface. The star displays a strong X-ray emission.

References

K-type main-sequence stars
Flare stars
BY Draconis variables
Virgo (constellation)
Durchmusterung objects
0517
118100
066252
Virginis, EQ
Emission-line stars